The wedgy-lipped miner bee (Andrena cuneilabris) is a species of miner bee in the family Andrenidae. It is found in North America.

References

Further reading

 
 

cuneilabris